Settimo Rottaro is a comune (municipality) in the Metropolitan City of Turin in the Italian region Piedmont, located about  northeast of Turin. It takes its name (Settimo meaning "seventh" in Italian) from its distance from Ivrea, amounting to seven Roman miles.

Settimo Rottaro borders the following municipalities: Azeglio, Caravino, Borgo d'Ale, and Cossano Canavese.

References

Cities and towns in Piedmont
Canavese